Carl Spencer Frederick Glasgow (2 April 1883 – 25 December 1954) was an Australian Member of Parliament and lawyer.

Early life
Glasgow was born in Narrandera, New South Wales, the son of William Henry Glasgow and Rebecca Jane Ross. He attended Newington College (1896–1899) and was articled in 1900.

Legal career
From 1904 he was a legal clerk in Narrandera and after a period as a managing clerk in Sydney he was admitted as a solicitor in 1912. Glasgow worked with Kershaw, Matthews and Lane from 1913 until 1920 and after becoming a partner the firm was known as Kershaw, Matthews, Lane and Glasgow from 1920 until 1954.

Political service
In local government, Glasgow served as an alderman on Waverley Council from 1914 until 1915. He was elected the National Party member for Waverley in the NSW Legislative Assembly on 8 October 1927 and served until 18 September 1930. He explained to the citizens of his home town in Narandera that he had a temporary breakdown and thought it wise not to go on with his political career.

Community activities
Glasgow was a Freemason and a prominent Odd Fellow, becoming Grand Sire of Australasia and representing Australia at a world conference in the United States of America in 1925. He was president of New South Wales Friendly Societies Association from 1913 until 1915.

Later life
He married Sara Maria McCracken in 1907 and had a daughter (Jean) and two sons (Roy and Keith). Sara Glasgow died in 1918. In 1920 he married Elsa Marie Duval and had three daughters (Barbara, Betty and Pat). Glasgow served as president of the Old Newingtonians' Union in 1929 and 1930. His second wife, Elsa, was president of the Ex-students' Union of St Catherine's School, Waverley.

Glasgow died at Royal Sydney Golf Club, Rose Bay, New South Wales, where he had been a member for many years. His funeral was held at Waverley Methodist Church and the Eastern Suburbs Crematorium. His ashes are buried with his two wives at Waverley Cemetery.

References

1883 births
1954 deaths
Members of the New South Wales Legislative Assembly
Australian Methodists
People educated at Newington College
Old Newingtonians' Union presidents
20th-century Australian politicians
Burials at Eastern Suburbs Memorial Park
Waverley Council